Mont Tournier is a mountain of Savoie, France. It lies in the Jura range.

Mountains of Savoie